Valerij Dzmitryevich Shantalosau (born 15 March 1966) is a Belarusian professional football coach and a former player. He is the goalkeepers coach with FC Dynamo Makhachkala.

Playing career
He made his professional debut in the Soviet Second League in 1985 for FC Dnepr Mogilev.

On 19 December 2008, the Football Federation of Belarus declared Shantalosau persona non grata and disqualified him for trying to fix two UEFA Euro 2004 qualification games of Belarus national football team - against the Czech Republic and Moldova. Federation also asked FIFA to extend his disqualification worldwide.

International career
Shantalosau has been capped for Belarus 26 times between 1992 and 2002. Before that, he been called up for Russia once, but did not debut.

Honours
Belshina Bobruisk
Belarusian Premier League champion: 2001
Belarusian Cup winner: 2000–01

References

1966 births
Living people
Soviet footballers
Belarusian footballers
Belarus international footballers
FK Liepājas Metalurgs players
Daugava Rīga players
FC Lokomotiv Nizhny Novgorod players
FC Baltika Kaliningrad players
FC Torpedo Moscow players
FC Torpedo-2 players
FC Tobol players
Russian Premier League players
Belarusian football managers
Belarusian expatriate sportspeople in Kazakhstan
FC Dnepr Mogilev players
FC Belshina Bobruisk players
FC Torpedo Minsk players
Association football goalkeepers
Belarusian expatriate footballers
Expatriate footballers in Russia
Expatriate footballers in Kazakhstan
People from Mogilev
Sportspeople from Mogilev Region